RK Sintelon was a Serbian handball club based in Bačka Palanka.

History
The club was founded in 1952 as RK Tekstilac. They changed their name to RK Sintelon in 1970 after being acquired by the textile factory of the same name. In 1994, the club earned promotion to the top flight for the first time ever. They would win their first trophy in June 2000 by capturing the national cup. During the 2002–03 season, the club went through financial difficulties and withdrew from the national championship before the end of the campaign. They returned to the top flight two years later. In 2007, the club changed its name to RK Tarkett due to changes in the club's ownership. They eventually withdrew from the Serbian Handball Super League after the start of the 2009–10 season.

Honours
FR Yugoslavia Cup
 1999–2000

Notable players
The list includes players who played for their respective national teams in any major international tournaments, such as the Olympic Games, World Championships and European Championships:

  Ratko Đurković
  Draško Mrvaljević
  Danijel Šarić
  Danijel Anđelković
  Bojan Beljanski
  Dalibor Čutura
  Nikola Kojić
  Ratko Nikolić
  Žarko Šešum
  Marko Vujin
  Nebojša Golić
  Marko Krivokapić
  Dragan Sudžum

Head coaches
  Branislav Zeljković
  Mile Isaković
  Zoran Kurteš
  Jovica Elezović (2000–2003)
  Predrag Petljanski
  Jovica Elezović
  Aleksandar Savić (2007–2009)

References

External links
 RK Sintelon – EHF competition record

Sintelon
Handball clubs established in 1952
1952 establishments in Yugoslavia
Handball clubs disestablished in 2009
2009 disestablishments in Serbia
Bačka Palanka